Kozłówek may refer to the following places:
Kozłówek, Pomeranian Voivodeship (north Poland)
Kozłówek, Subcarpathian Voivodeship (south-east Poland)
Kozłówek, Świętokrzyskie Voivodeship (south-central Poland)
Kozłówek, informal common name of the Osiedle na Kozłówku neighbourhood in  Prokocim, Cracow.